

Reservation may refer to:

Places
Types of places:
 Indian reservation, in the United States
 Military base, often called reservations
 Nature reserve

Government and law
 Reservation (law), a caveat to a treaty
 Reservation in India, a government policy imposing quotas for political representation
 Disallowance and reservation, a constitutional power in several Commonwealth nations

Arts, entertainment, and media
 Reservation (mixtape), a mixtape by Angel Haze
 "Reservations", a song by Spoon from their album A Series of Sneaks
 "Reservations", a song by Wilco from their album Yankee Hotel Foxtrot

Other uses
  Reserved sacrament or Reservation of the Sacrament, a Christian religious practice
Table reservation, for restaurant seating
Computer reservation system, for travel and accommodations

See also
 Reserve (disambiguation)
 Indian reserve, in Canada
 Indigenous territory (disambiguation)